Son Jun-ho is a Korean name consisting of the family name Son and the given name Jun-ho, and may also refer to:

 Son Jun-ho (actor) (born 1983), South Korean actor
 Son Jun-ho (footballer) (born 1992), South Korean footballer